Feebate is a portmanteau of "fee" and "rebate". A feebate program is a self-financing system of fees and rebates that are used to shift the costs of externalities produced by the private expropriation, fraudulent abstraction, or outright destruction of public goods onto those market actors responsible. Originally coined in the 1970s by Arthur H. Rosenfeld, feebate programs have typically been used to shift buying habits in the transportation and energy sectors.

Examples 

California's proposed "Clean Car Discount" program (AB493-Ruskin) was designed to help reduce the state's global warming/greenhouse gas emissions by imposing a fee of up to $2,500 on new, high carbon emitting vehicles (starting with 2011 models), and then rebating the fee to buyers of new low emission vehicles, thereby theoretically shifting the social cost of the destruction of public goods by global warming onto those who contribute to global warming. This Bill failed to pass.

Supporters point towards what they feel are feebates' tendency to promote personal responsibility by having those responsible for the involuntary expropriation (by means of force and fraud) of public goods from the public—and each and every private individual—by destruction of the environment or other negligent behavior towards private and public property, by having polluters pay for the externalities that they impose upon society. In the case of personal cars, feebates share some of the same aims as fuel taxes, vehicle registration fees, congestion charging, and road pricing.

In some situations, feebates can be a more efficient (or complementary) way of promoting greater fuel efficiency and other socially-desirable outcomes than traditional taxes or quotas. Fuel taxes create important price signals that can make consumers aware of the non-internalized costs of fuel consumption (greenhouse gasses, other pollution)—and raise funds to offset this externality. But retail consumers have very high discount rates, meaning buyers do not take into account the additional cost high gasoline taxes or poor gas mileage when purchasing a car. A feebate internalizes that cost into the initial purchase price, thereby requiring the buyer to prepay for the taking of public and private environmental goods.

Another example of a feebate is proposed in the Rocky Mountain Institute's 2004 publication, "Winning the Oil Endgame". For each class of car and light truck, a feebate mechanism is used to reward buyers of vehicles that are more fuel efficient than the average vehicle in that class and penalize buyers of less fuel efficient vehicles. This feebate is revenue-neutral, meaning that the amount of money collected through fees (surcharges) equals the amount paid out in rebates.

See also
Cross subsidization
Ecotax
Green economy
Pigouvian tax
Tax shift

References

External links
 Environment Canada-sponsored study on options for feebate programs in Canada

Vehicle taxes